Matthew Douglas Stinchcomb (born June 3, 1977) is a former American college and professional football player who was an offensive lineman in the National Football League (NFL) for seven seasons.  He played college football for the University of Georgia, and earned All-American honors.  He was a first-round pick in the 1999 NFL Draft, and played professionally for the Oakland Raiders and Tampa Bay Buccaneers of the NFL.

Early years
Stinchcomb was born in Atlanta, Georgia. He attended Parkview High School in Lilburn, Georgia, and played for the Parkview Panthers high school football team.

College career
Stinchcomb attended the University of Georgia, where he played for the Georgia Bulldogs football team from 1995 to 1998. He was a first-team All-American selection at tackle in 1997, and was recognized as a consensus first-team All-American following the 1998 season.

Professional career
Stinchcomb was selected as the 18th pick of the first round in the 1999 NFL Draft to the Oakland Raiders. He missed his entire rookie season due to a shoulder injury and surgery.  He started the first eight games at left tackle the following season before suffering a knee and shoulder injury.  This led to his move inside the offensive line to guard and center. He started every game during his only healthy season in 2004 with Tampa Bay.  The following season with the Bucs Stinchcomb injured his back in practice, requiring surgery.  Complications from the surgery led to blood clots and a heart condition, forcing his retirement in 2006.

In 2009, Stinchcomb was named to the University of Georgia's Circle of Honor, the highest level of distinction for any UGA student-athlete.  He also represented Georgia in being named to the 2009 class of "SEC Legends" which was recognized during pregame of the SEC Championship Game.

Personal life
He is the older brother of Jon Stinchcomb, who was also an All-American offensive tackle at Georgia and who played with the New Orleans Saints. Matt, Jon, and former Georgia quarterback David Greene host a children's charity event each year at Georgia, "Countdown to Kickoff," for Georgia football fans.

Stinchcomb is married and has three children.

Life after football
Stinchcomb is currently a college football analyst for ESPNU and SEC Network.

He and David Greene operate the Atlanta offices of Seacrest Partners, an insurance brokerage firm in Atlanta.

In 2018, Stinchcomb was inducted into the College Football Hall of Fame.

References

External links
 http://espnmediazone.com/us/bios/stinchcomb_matt/
 

1977 births
Living people
People from Lilburn, Georgia
Sportspeople from the Atlanta metropolitan area
Players of American football from Georgia (U.S. state)
American football offensive tackles
Georgia Bulldogs football players
All-American college football players
William V. Campbell Trophy winners
College Football Hall of Fame inductees
Tampa Bay Buccaneers players
Oakland Raiders players
College football announcers
Ed Block Courage Award recipients